Volverás may refer to:

"Volverás" (Gloria Estefan song), 1993
"Volverás" (Ricky Martin song), 1997
"Volverás", a 2004 song by Paulina Rubio as an album track on Pau-Latina
"Volverás", a 1982 song by Los Terricolas